KBLR may refer to:

 KBLR (TV), a television station (channel 39) licensed to Paradise, Nevada, United States
 KBSL-DT, a television station (channel 10) licensed to Goodland, Kansas, which held the KBLR call sign from 1958 to 1961
 KOBM-FM, a radio station (97.3 FM) licensed to Blair, Nebraska, United States, which held the KBLR call sign from 2001 to 2018
 KYOO (AM), a radio station (1200 AM) licensed to Bolivar, Missouri, United States, which held the KBLR call sign from 1961 to 1979
 KLOE, a radio station (730 AM) licensed to Goodland, Kansas, which held the KBLR call sign from 1958 to 1960